These hits topped the Dutch Top 40 in 1982 (see 1982 in music).

See also
1982 in music

References

1982 in the Netherlands
1982 record charts
1982